Vincent Farkaš (born 13 January 1993) is a Slovak canoeist. He competed in the men's C-1 1000 metres event at the 2016 Summer Olympics.

References

External links
 

1993 births
Living people
Slovak male canoeists
Olympic canoeists of Slovakia
Canoeists at the 2016 Summer Olympics
Place of birth missing (living people)